Elanad  is a small town  in   Thrissur district in the state of Kerala, India.

This place is well known for its communal harmony.  The Kaliyaroad Nercha, though is celebrated in a Muslim Mosque, the Nercha is taken by all castes and communities. The Thendankavil Ucharal Vela is being celebrated by all.  There are Christians and Musims who offer their services during the Vela celebrations.  Similarly in the Pulipuram Ayyapan Vilakku Utsavam, all communities come together and celebrate it with full enthusiasm.

Economy
The predominant occupation in Elanad is agriculture and related activities. The primary economy is agriculture. The terrain is slightly hilly with highly verdant forests and rubber plantations.Elanadu Milk pvt limited is famous milk entrepreneur in kerala that is situated in Elanad. There is a waterfalls named Mannathipara.

Education
 St Johns High School, Ramanchetty

 G.U.P. School
 A.L.P. School
 Sanjos Central School
 Holy Family Nursery School
 Kaliaroad Jaram School
 Akshara Education centre
 A.L.P.S, Vennur
St:Josephs H.S pangarapilly

Festivals

 Elanad Vela (February)
 Kalia Road Nercha (February/March) [Kalia Road Nercha is a well-known festival in Kerala. It is an example for community friendship. One hundred or more elephants participate in this festival. Kalia Road is 4 km from Elanad centre.]
 Narikundu Nercha (January month)
 Pulipuram Ayyappan Vilaaku (10 December)
 St Mary's Orthodox Palliperunal (24 April)
 Mor Ignathious Elias Simhasana Pally Valiya Perunal(7 & 8 January)
 Vennur Mundiyan Kavu Vela ( February)
 Kodakkadi Muthi Vela (April)

Churches

Mor Ignathious Elias Simhasana Church Kunnumpuram Elanad
St. Mary's Orthodox Syrian Church
St. Ann's R.C. Church,
St. Joseph's Malankara Church,
Elanad Fellowship Pentecostal Church
Indian Pentecostal Church, 
Indian Pentecostal Church (God),
Brethren Church.

Temples
Thendankavil Bhaghavathi Temple,
Elanad Siva Temple
Pulipuram Ayyappan Temple,
Kottaram Bhaghavathi Temple,
Kizhakkumuri Siva Temple,
Vennur Mundiyankavu Bhaghavathi Temple.
Mundian Kavu (Near Kottaram Bhagavathi Temple)
Kodakkadi Muthi Temple

Banks

State Bank of Travancore,
Pazhayannur Cooperative Society Bank,
Elanad Multi-Purpose Cooperative Society.
Canara Bank
ESAF Bank-Vennur
S N Nidhi micro finance

Financiers

Manappuram Finance,
Muthott Fincorp,
Mass Finance,
Mangalam Finance,
Pazhayannur Kuries.

References

Villages in Thrissur district